Adventures in a City that does not Exist is a 1974 Soviet children's musical film, directorial debut of Leonid Nechayev.

Plot
Pioneer Slava Kurochkin dreams of space. He actively studies physics and astronomy, but at the same time he does not read fiction at all. By coincidence, he finds himself in a fairytale town, where the heroes of the most famous books live: The Snow Queen, Timur and His Squad, The White Solitary Sails, Les Misérables, Treasure Island and so on.

But, alas, in the city live not only positive characters - treacherous commerce adviser from the play The Snow Queen (by Evgeny Schwartz) decides to use Slavin's ignorance of books in order to deceive him and with the help of other antagonists to subjugate readers worldwide. The protagonists come to help the boy, and together with friends Slava manages to defeat the adviser and his henchmen. When Slava returns to the real world, the first thing he does is to go to the library.

Cast

Protagonists
Evgeny Goryachev as Slava Kurochkin, reader
Igor Anisimov as Timur Garaev (from the book Timur and His Squad)
Vyacheslav Baranov as Gavrosh (voiced by Hagar Vlasov) (from the book Les Misérables)
Alexander Plyushchev as Petya Bachey (from the book The White Solitary Sails)
Alexander Pokko as  Gavrik (voiced by Nadezhda Podyapolskaya) (from the book The White Solitary Sails)
Tatiana Prusakova as  Pippi Longstocking (from the book Pippi Longstocking)
Igor Ambrazhevich as  Tom Sawyer (from the book The Adventures of Tom Sawyer)
Igor Kondratovich as  Huckleberry Finn (from the book The Adventures of Tom Sawyer)
Irina Shilkina as  Gerda (from the fairy tale of H. C. Andersen The Snow Queen)
Nikolai Grinko as  Don Quixote (voiced by Artem Karapetyan) (from the book "The Clever Hidalgo Don Quixote of La Mancha")
Mikhail Sachuk as  Dimka the Invisible (from the book of the same name by   Korostylyov and   Lvovsky)
Alexander Pyatkov as  Mitrofanushka (from the play The Minor)
Fedor Khramtsov as  armorer Prospero (from the book Three Fat Men)
Galina Linnik as  Somova

Antagonists
Valentīns Skulme as  commerce adviser (voiced by Zinovy Gerdt) (from the play The Snow Queen by Evgeny Schwartz)
Gediminas Karka as  Javer, Police Inspector (from the Les Misérables)
Valery Nosik as  informant "Mustache" (from the book The White Solitary Sails)
Leonid Kanevsky as  Captain Bonaventure (from the book Three Fat Men)
Ivan Pereverzev as  John Silver (from the book Treasure Island)
Igor Gushchin as  "Figure" (from the book Timur and His Squad)
Vadim Aleksandrov as  short pirate
Rostislav Shmyrev as  general
Valentin Bukin as  owner of a pirate restaurant
Stefaniya Stanyuta as  Aunt Polly (from the book The Adventures of Tom Sawyer)

References

External links
 

Soviet musical films
1970s musical fantasy films
Russian children's fantasy films
1970s children's adventure films
Belarusfilm films
1974 directorial debut films
1974 films
Films directed by Leonid Nechayev
1970s children's fantasy films
Films based on fairy tales
1970s Russian-language films
Soviet children's films